San Carlos (also Gran Caldera de Luba, or simply Caldera) is a basaltic shield volcano with a broad summit caldera on the island of Bioko, Equatorial Guinea. With an elevation of 2,261 metres above sea level it is the second highest peak in Equatorial Guinea.

See also
 Luba Crater Scientific Reserve
 List of Ultras of Africa

References

Shield volcanoes of Equatorial Guinea
Polygenetic shield volcanoes
Calderas of Equatorial Guinea